Michael Sims (born February 17, 1958 in Crossville, TN) is an American nonfiction writer. His books include Darwin's Orchestra (1997), Adam's Navel (2003), Apollo’s Fire (2007), In the Womb: Animals (2009), and The Story of Charlotte's Web (2011).  He is also an anthologist, editor of several volumes of Victorian and Edwardian fiction and poetry.

Early life
Born in rural eastern Tennessee, near the small town of Crossville, Sims has described in interviews how he grew up in a household without a telephone, an automobile, or, at times, indoor plumbing. He spent his teenage years in a wheelchair because of rheumatic arthritis following an attack of rheumatic fever.  Although Robert Macfarlane in the Sunday Times (London) said that Sims "is clearly the beneficiary of a wide-ranging American liberal-arts education", actually Sims did not attend university. But he developed in childhood a preoccupation with literature, art, and nature, themes that dominate his adult work.

Career
Sims published his first book, Darwin's Orchestra, in 1997, about which Martin Gardner wrote, "Sims's range is awesome." But it was Sims's second book, Adam's Navel: A Natural and Cultural History of the Human Form, in 2003, that established his reputation as an original and witty observer of the natural world. Published simultaneously in the U.S. and England, it was chosen as a Library Journal Best Science Book and a New York Times Notable Book. In 2007 Viking published Apollo's Fire: A Day on Earth in Nature and Imagination, which National Public Radio chose as one of the best science books of the year. In 2009 National Geographic Books published In the Womb: Animals, a companion book to two installments of the acclaimed In the Womb series on the National Geographic Channel.

Sims's writing has been published in many periodicals, including the Washington Post, Los Angeles Times, New Statesman, Chronicle of Higher Education, Gourmet, Orion and American Archaeology.

He has appeared on many radio and television programs, including a multi-part documentary about women's bodies on BBC Radio 4's popular program Woman's Hour, as well as on The Early Show on CBS and Inside Edition.

Books by Michael Sims
1997	 -  Darwin’s Orchestra: An Almanac of Nature in History and the Arts (Henry Holt)

2003	 - Adam’s Navel: A Natural and Cultural History of the Human Form (Viking; published in England by Allen Lane/Penguin, with the subtitles "A Natural and Cultural History of the Human Body" and "The Weird and Wonderful Story of the Human Body")

2007 – Apollo’s Fire: A Day on Earth in Nature and Imagination (Viking); U.S. paperback (Penguin) subtitle "A Journey through the Extraordinary Wonders of an Ordinary Day"

2009 – In the Womb: Animals (National Geographic Books), linked to a documentary series on the National Geographic Channel

2011 - The Story of Charlotte's Web (Walker) subtitle "E. B. White's Eccentric Life in Nature and the Birth of an American Classic"

2014 - "The Adventures of Henry Thoreau: A Young Man's Unlikely Path to Walden Pond"  (Bloomsbury USA)

2017 - 
www.goodreads.com/book/show/30038995-arthur-and-sherlock
Arthur and Sherlock (Bloomsbury)

Collections edited
2006 – The Annotated Archy and Mehitabel, by Don Marquis, Edited with Notes and Introduction by Michael Sims (Penguin Classics)

2007 – Arsene Lupin, Gentleman-Thief, by Maurice Leblanc, Edited with Notes and Introduction by Michael Sims (Penguin Classics)

2009 – The Penguin Book of Gaslight Crime, Edited with Notes and Introduction by Michael Sims (Penguin Classics)

2010 – Dracula's Guest: A Connoisseur's Collection of Victorian Vampire Stories, Edited with Notes and Introduction by Michael Sims (Walker & Company)

2011 - The Penguin Book of Victorian Women in Crime: Forgotten Cops and Private Eyes from the Time of Sherlock Holmes, Edited with Notes and Introduction by Michael Sims (Penguin Classics)

2011 - "The Dead Witness: A Connoisseur's Collection of Victorian Detective Stories", Edited with Notes and Introduction by Michael Sims (Walker & Company)

External links
 Official Website
 John Banville’s review of Adam’s Navel in the New York Times Book Review
 'Some Pig, Some Book', Anthony Esolen, The Wall Street Journal, 11 June 2011

American social sciences writers
1958 births
Living people
People from Cumberland County, Tennessee